The Opel GT is a front-engine, rear-drive two-seat sports car manufactured and marketed by Opel in two generations — separated by a 34-year hiatus.

The first generation Opel GT (1968–1973) debuted as a styling exercise in 1965 at the Paris and Frankfurt motor shows. The production vehicle used mechanical components from the contemporary Opel Kadett B and two-door hard top bodywork by French contractor Brissonneau & Lotz. The styling of the GT was often cited as similar to the 1968 Chevrolet Corvette which went on sale in September 1967.

Opel marketed a second generation GT (2007-2009) as a rebadged variant of the Saturn Sky two-seater convertible (which was based on the Pontiac Solstice), manufactured in Wilmington, Delaware, USA.

In 2016, Opel introduced the GT Concept at the 2016 Geneva Motor Show as a lightweight, turbocharged, rear-wheel drive two-seater.

GT (1968–1973)

The Opel GT was equipped with a base 1.1 L OHV inline-four engine, which produced 67 hp (SAE) at 6,000 rpm. However, most buyers chose an optional 1.9 L camshaft in head engine, which produced 102 hp (SAE) at 5200 to 5400 rpm. Some of the early 1968 models also came with a slightly higher compression "H" code cylinder head. In 1971, due to emissions regulations, Opel reduced the compression ratio of the 1.9 L engine used in the US and output fell to 83 hp (SAE). There was also a GT/J model, which was a less expensive version of the 1900-engined GT which was sold only in Europe. Standard transmission was a manual four-speed. A three-speed automatic was available with the 1.9 L engine. The model run of the Opel GT was from 1968 to 1973.

The Opel GT uses a steel unibody and a front mid-engined, rear-wheel drive layout. The engine is mounted far back in the chassis to improve weight distribution. Front suspension consists of upper A-arms and a lower transverse leaf spring — aside from the Opel's styling, the unusual use of a transverse leaf-spring in the suspension was another remarkable commonality with Chevrolet's Corvette. A live axle and coil springs are used in the rear. The power-assisted braking system uses discs in the front, drums in the rear. Steering is unassisted.

One unusual feature of the Opel GT is the operation of the pop-up headlights. They are manually operated, by way of a large lever along the center console next to the shifter. Unlike most pop-up headlights, they both rotate in the same direction (counterclockwise from inside the car) about a longitudinal axis.

Designed by Opel stylist Erhard Schnell, the GT is a fastback, that has neither an externally accessible trunk nor a conventional hatchback. There is a parcel shelf behind the seats that can only be accessed through the main doors. Behind the parcel shelf is a fold-up panel that conceals a spare tire and jack.

During 1968 to 1973, a total of 103,463 cars were sold. The most collectible GTs are probably the first few hundred cars hand-assembled in 1968 and the 1968–1970 models with the 1.1 L engine, which totaled 3,573 cars. Of the later cars, 10,760 were the cheaper model (GT/J), which lacked nearly all chrome parts and offered fewer standard features. In some markets, items like a limited slip differential, front and rear anti-sway bars, heated rear window, and engine bay light were standard, although most cars were shipped without them.

In North America, the GT was sold at Buick dealerships. Reasons for ending production were the need to redesign the car to remain competitive with up-and-coming sports models, such as the Datsun 240Z, as well as the termination of Brissonneau and Lotz' bodybuilding contract. Unusually for the period, there was no Vauxhall equivalent model to the GT sold in the United Kingdom.

The Opel GT was also used by Italian coachbuilder Sergio Coggiola to create the Opel Sylvia GT, an angular design of the folded-paper school. The 1973 Sylvia was also designed with an eye to safety.

Automotive magazine Road & Track reviewed the GT in their June 1969 issue, recording 0–96 km/h in 10.8 seconds and a top speed of 182 km/h. Road & Track also found the car to have strong understeer, suggesting the 165x13 tires to be too small, although the ride was comfortable.

GT (roadster) (2007–2010)

The new Opel GT was produced from 2007 to 2010. It was a badge engineered variant of the Pontiac Solstice and the Saturn Sky and was available solely with the 2.0 L,  direct injection turbocharged Ecotec four-cylinder engine. It had 18-inch alloy wheels. The car replaced the Opel Speedster in the European lineup however it was not sold in right-hand drive in the UK, thus there was no replacement for the Vauxhall VX220. The Saturn Sky and Pontiac Solstice were produced at a North American plant which did not have the necessary tooling for producing right-hand drive vehicles.

Production by model year

GT Concept (2016)

The 2016 Opel GT concept debuted on 27 January 2016. Built on an all-new compact rear-wheel-drive platform, the GT has a lightweight construction and stripped down interior. Power comes from a turbocharged 1.0-liter three-cylinder engine producing 145 hp with a 6-speed semi-automatic gearbox.

The concept features historic design cues associated with Opel's past products; the twin tailpipes with the GT wordmark in the middle are reminiscent of those on the original 1965 GT prototype.

The car made its first public debut on March 1 at the 2016 Geneva Motor Show. A production version was being conjectured to follow in 2018, commemorating the 50th anniversary of the original Opel GT's unveiling in 1968, and Opel didn't rule out the possibility.

However, the production Opel GT concept was cancelled not only due to a shrinking market for sports cars, but also the brand's acquisition by Groupe PSA.

References

Further reading

External links

 Opel Motorsport Club
 The Classic Opel Community
 VisualOpel - Illustrations, diagrams, and parts
 Forum for the 2007-2009 Opel GT
 Opel GT Source

GT
Rear-wheel-drive vehicles
Coupés
Roadsters
1970s cars
Cars introduced in 1968
Cars introduced in 2006